Khanit Sinlapasor (born 12 July 1994) is a member of the Thailand men's national volleyball team.

Clubs
  Chonburi E-Tech Air Force (2012–2016)
  NK Fitness Samutsakhon (2016–2017)
  Air Force (2017)

Awards

Clubs 
 2012–13 Thailand League -  Bronze Medal, with Chonburi
 2013–14 Thailand League -  Runner-up, with Chonburi
 2014–15 Thailand League -  Runner-up, with Chonburi E-Tech Air Force
 2014 Thai-Denmark Super League -  Champion, with Chonburi VC
 2015 Thai-Denmark Super League -  Champion, with Chonburi VC
 2015–16 Thailand League -  3rd place, with Chonburi E-Tech Air Force
 2017 Thai-Denmark Super League -  Bronze Medal, with NK Fitness Samutsakhon

References

1994 births
Living people
Khanit Sinlapasorn
Khanit Sinlapasorn
Volleyball players at the 2014 Asian Games
Khanit Sinlapasorn
Southeast Asian Games medalists in volleyball
Competitors at the 2015 Southeast Asian Games
Khanit Sinlapasorn
Khanit Sinlapasorn